Thomas Keith Robert Beere (born 27 January 1995) is an English footballer who plays as a midfielder for Tonbridge Angels.

Career
Beere joined the AFC Wimbledon academy after a short spell at Millwall, having left Fisher Athletic when he was 15. He appeared once in the 2012–13 season, as an unused substitute in the away match against Accrington Stanley on 19 March 2013. During the 2013–14 season, he was twice more named on the bench for the games against Northampton at home and Morecambe away. He signed a new professional contract in May 2014, and just days later scored the winning goal in the 2014 London Senior Cup final, a 2–1 win over Met Police.

After twice more featuring as an unused substitute at the beginning of the 2014–15 season, he made his first team debut in the EFL Trophy victory over Southend, scoring in the penalty shoot-out after a 2–2 draw. Four days later on 6 September 2014, he made his Football League debut in the 4–4 draw away to Carlisle, coming on as a substitute in the seventy-ninth minute.

Following his breakthrough season in 2014–15 at Wimbledon in which he made 20 first-team appearances, he found first-team opportunities hard to come by following injury, and he joined Bishop's Stortford of the National League South on 24 November 2015 on an initial one-month loan deal. Beere scored his first league goal, a game-winner in added time, during the home leg of the first round of the 2016 League Two Promotion Playoff against Accrington Stanley. Called on as a late substitute, Beere had only just returned from loan at non-league Hampton and Richmond. He was not named on the bench and would not have been selected if Connor Smith was match ready.

Career statistics

References

External links
 
 AFC Wimbledon profile
 

Living people
1995 births
English footballers
Footballers from Southwark
Association football midfielders
English Football League players
National League (English football) players
Isthmian League players
AFC Wimbledon players
Bishop's Stortford F.C. players
Gateshead F.C. players
Hampton & Richmond Borough F.C. players
Tonbridge Angels F.C. players
Leatherhead F.C. players
Greenwich Borough F.C. players
Kingstonian F.C. players